James Mott (20 June 1788 – 26 January 1868) was a Quaker leader, teacher, merchant, and anti-slavery activist. He was married to suffragist leader Lucretia Mott.

Life and work
James was born in Cow Neck in North Hempstead on Long Island, to a Quaker family. He was the second of seven children and the first son born to Adam Mott (1762-1839) and his wife and distant cousin, Anne Mott (1768-1852).  James later taught for two years at the Nine Partners Boarding School in Millbrook, New York where his father was the superintendent.

At Nine Partners, he also met his future wife Lucretia Coffin, a student and later a teacher's aide. He married her on 10 April 1811 in Philadelphia. They had six children, five of whom lived to adulthood, four daughters and a son. James then began work as a partner in Lucretia's father's nail business in Philadelphia. In 1822, James became a textile merchant dealing in cotton. His Hicksite Quaker opposition to slavery, combined with increasing calls to end slavery by boycotting slave goods, influenced James to switch to dealing in wool, produced without the labor of slaves.

Like his wife, James was an active abolitionist, dedicated his life to abolition and the free produce movement. In 1833, he attended the founding meeting of the American Anti-Slavery Society in Philadelphia, and signed the convention's declaration. Later, he helped found the Pennsylvania Anti-Slavery Society with Lucretia.

Mott's sister, Abigail Lydia Mott, and brother-in-law, Lindley Murray Moore were instrumental in founding the Rochester Anti-Slavery Society in 1838.

In 1841, he published Three Months in Great Britain, an account of the journey he took with Lucretia to attend the World's Anti-Slavery Convention in London in 1840. Though both he and his wife traveled as official delegates, the convention voted to exclude the female delegates from the United States. James Mott participated as an official delegate.

James chaired the Seneca Falls Convention, the first women's rights convention, held in Seneca Falls, New York in 1848 on July 19 and 20 at which his wife was the main speaker. He and Lucretia signed the convention's Declaration of Sentiments.

His brother, Richard Mott, was elected as an Opposition Party candidate to the Thirty-fourth and reelected as a Republican to the Thirty-fifth Congresses (March 4, 1855 - March 3, 1859)

In 1864, James helped start Swarthmore College in Pennsylvania. He died of pneumonia in 1868 while visiting his daughter in Brooklyn, New York.

Further reading
 Hersh, Blanche Glassman. The Slavery of Sex: Feminist Abolitionists in America (1978)
 "Mott, James." Dictionary of American Biography. Vol. 1, Charles Scribner's Sons. 1928.
 
 Perry, Lewis. "Mott, James" American National Biography (1999) https://doi.org/10.1093/anb/9780198606697.article.1500493

References

1788 births
1868 deaths
American abolitionists
Quaker abolitionists
Deaths from pneumonia in New York City
Pennsylvania Republicans
Pennsylvania Oppositionists
Quaker feminists
Male feminists